Schinia citrinella is a moth of the family Noctuidae. It is found in North America, including Arizona, California, Colorado, Kansas, Nebraska, Nevada, New Mexico, Oklahoma, Texas, Utah and northern Mexico.

The wingspan is about 26 mm.

The larvae feed on Croton species.

External links
Butterflies and Moths of North America

Schinia
Moths of North America
Moths described in 1870